Campus Rhythm is a 1943 American musical film directed by Arthur Dreifuss and starring Johnny Downs, Gale Storm and Robert Lowery.

Cast
 Johnny Downs as 'Scoop' Davis 
 Gale Storm as Joan Abbott, aka Susie Smith 
 Robert Lowery as Buzz O'Hara 
 Douglas Leavitt as Uncle William 'Willie' Aloysius Smith 
 Herbert Heyes as J.P. Hartman 
 Marie Blake as Susie Smith - Hartman's secretary 
 Claudia Drake as Cynthia Walker 
 GeGe Pearson as Babs Marlow
 Johnny Duncan as Freshie, a Freshman 
 Candy Candido as Harold 
 Genevieve Grazis as Dancer

References

Bibliography
 Tucker, David C. Gale Storm: A Biography and Career Record. McFarland, 2018.

External links
 

1943 films
1943 musical films
American musical films
Monogram Pictures films
Films directed by Arthur Dreifuss
Films produced by Lindsley Parsons
American black-and-white films
1940s English-language films
1940s American films